Petrovsky District is an administrative district (raion), one of the twenty-six in Stavropol Krai, Russia. Municipally, it is incorporated as Petrovsky Municipal District. It is located in the center of the krai. Its administrative center is the town of Svetlograd. Population:  82,449 (2002 Census); 76,718 (1989 Census). The population of Svetlograd accounts for 49.3% of the district's total population.

References

Notes

Sources

Districts of Stavropol Krai